is a Japanese mobile game developed by Pyramid and published by Colopl; it was originally released in January 2018. The game received an original video animation adaptation by Nomad in September 2021. A console variant of the mobile game, titled Alice Gear Aegis CS: Concerto of Simulatrix, by Mages was released for the Nintendo Switch, PlayStation 4, and PlayStation 5 in September 2022 in Japan, followed by a worldwide release in March 2023. An anime television series adaptation, also by Nomad, is scheduled to premiere in April 2023.

Characters

Media

Mobile game
The game was first announced on July 25, 2017; it was also announced to be developed by Pyramid and published by Colopl, with character designs from Fumikane Shimada, mech designs from Kanetake Ebikawa and Takayuki Yanase, and music written by Zuntata. The game released on January 22, 2018, on iOS and Android. The game was released on PC on June 4, 2019.

Video game
Under the title Alice Gear Aegis CS: Concerto of Simulatrix, the console variant of the game was released in Japan by Mages on September 8, 2022, for the Nintendo Switch, PlayStation 4 and PlayStation 5. Published by PQube, a worldwide launch on the same systems is set for a March 16, 2023, release.

Anime
In October 2020, it was announced that the game would be receiving an original video animation (OVA) adaptation. The OVA, titled Alice Gear Aegis: Doki! Actress Darake no Mermaid Grand Prix, was produced by Nomad and directed by Hirokazu Hanai, with Rikiya Okano designing the characters, Masahiro Okubo writing the scripts, and Zuntata composing the music. It was released on September 15, 2021.

In January 2022, an anime television series adaptation of the game was announced. Nomad, Hirokazu Hanai, and Rikiya Okano all reprised their roles from the OVA as producer, director, and character designer respectively. However, Kenji Sugihara replaced Okubo as script writer. The series, titled Alice Gear Aegis Expansion, is set to premiere on April 3, 2023, on Tokyo MX and other networks. The opening theme song is "Dash and Go!" by Aina Suzuki, while the ending theme song is "Just a little bit" by Marina Horiuchi. Sentai Filmworks licensed the series, and will be streaming it on Hidive.

See also
 Busou Shinki

References

External links
  
 

2018 video games
2021 anime OVAs
2022 video games
2023 anime television series debuts
Android (operating system) games
Anime television series based on video games
IOS games
Mecha anime and manga
Nintendo Switch games
Nomad (company)
OVAs based on video games
PlayStation 4 games
PlayStation 5 games
PQube games
Sentai Filmworks
Video games about mecha
Video games developed in Japan